Persuasion is a social influence.

Persuasion may also refer to:

  Peitho, Greek Mythology (Greek: Πειθώ, English translation: Persuasion)
 Persuasion (novel), an 1818 novel by Jane Austen
 Persuasion (1960 series), a British television mini-series
 Persuasion (1971 series), a TV miniseries based on the novel
 Persuasion (1995 film), a television film based on the novel
 Persuasion (2007 film), a television film based on the novel
 Persuasion (2022 film), an American film adaptation of the novel

Music 
 Persuasion (Santana album), 1989
 Persuasion (EP), an EP by Billie Ray Martin and Spooky
 Persuasion (Adam Ant album), an unreleased album by Adam Ant
 "Persuasion (Tim Finn song)", a song from Before & After
 "Persuasion", a song by Patti Smith from Gung Ho
 "Persuasion", a song by Throbbing Gristle from 20 Jazz Funk Greats
 The Persuasions, an American a cappella group
 "Persuasive", a song by Doechii

Other media 
 Persuasion (comics), a Marvel Comics superhero
 Adobe Persuasion, a presentation software
 Persuasion (online magazine), a nonprofit digital magazine